Algeciras is a town and municipality in the Huila Department, Colombia.

Municipalities of Huila Department